The 1924 Colorado Silver and Gold football team was an American football team that represented the University of Colorado as a member of the Rocky Mountain Conference (RMC) during the 1924 college football season. In its fifth year under head coach Myron E. Witham, the team compiled an 8–1–1 record (5–0–1 against RMC opponents), won the conference championship, was not scored upon during the regular season, lost a postseason game to undefeated Hawaii in the Poi Bowl, and outscored all opponents by a total of 237 to 13. The team's string of nine consecutive shutouts remains the longest in program history.

On October 11, 1924, the team played its first game at the newly-constructed Colorado Stadium. The Silver and Gold defeated  by a 39–0 score in that game.

The team's leading players included Hatfield Chilson and George Wittemeyer. On October 18, 1924, Chilson completed a pass to Wittemeyer that was good for 70 yards. It remained the longest passing play in program history until 1985.

Schedule

References

Colorado
Colorado Buffaloes football seasons
Rocky Mountain Athletic Conference football champion seasons
Colorado Silver and Gold football